Cross Coombe is a hamlet in the parish of St Agnes (where the 2011 census population is included), Cornwall, England, UK.

References

Hamlets in Cornwall